Laodicea  is a genus of cnidarians of the family  Laodiceidae. According to the World Register of Marine Species, the genus contains 18 described species.

References

Cnidarian genera
Animals described in 1843
Taxa named by René Lesson